Selina Shahid is a Bangladesh Nationalist Party politician and a Member of Parliament from reserved seat. Her husband, Shahidul Islam, was a member of parliament from Kushtia-2.

Career
Shahid was elected to parliament from reserved seat as an Bangladesh Nationalist Party candidate in 1991.

References

Bangladesh Nationalist Party politicians
Date of birth missing (living people)
5th Jatiya Sangsad members
Women members of the Jatiya Sangsad
20th-century Bangladeshi women politicians